Letters to Ghosts is the third studio album by British singer-songwriter Lucie Silvas. It was released on 18 September 2015 through Silvas' own record label, Furthest Point, via Caroline records and later released by Decca Records in 2016 following Silvas' signing with them.

It is the first album by Silvas since 2006 and signifies a musical change from the pop/adult contemporary of her previous releases to a more country/roots style following her move from the UK to Nashville, Tennessee.

The track "Find A Way" was subsequently recorded by Trisha Yearwood for her 2019 album Every Girl. Silvas provided backing vocals on Yearwood"s version.

Track listing

Personnel
Credits adapted from AllMusic.

Musicians
 Dave Angell – strings
 Jabe Beyer – acoustic guitar, vocals
 Butterfly Boucher – bass guitar
 David Davidson – strings
 Samuel Dixon – bass guitar
 Johnny Duke – guitar
 Fred Eltringham – drums
 Ian Fitchuk – drums, keyboards, percussion, piano
 Adam Gardner – bass guitar
 Jon Green – acoustic guitar, keyboards, vocals
 Natalie Hemby – background vocals
 Graham Kearns – guitar
 John Osborne – bass, guitar, mandolin, vocals
 Carole Rabinowitz – strings
 Kyle Ryan – acoustic guitar
 Lucie Silvas – lead vocals, mandolin, piano
 Ash Soan – drums
 Paul Turner – bass guitar
 Kristin Wilkinson – strings
 Kate York – vocals

Technical personnel
 Daniel Bacigalupi – assistant
 Paul Cossette – assistant engineer 
 Ian Fitchuk – producer
 Roi Hernandez – art direction, design
 Bill Hill – engineer
 Brad Hill – mixing, overdub engineer
 Sonya Jasinski – photography
 Jay Kay – executive producer
 Jordan Lehning – string arrangements
 Eric Masse – engineer
 Dave McNair – mastering
 John Osborne – producer
 Charlie Russell – mixing, producer, programming
 Reid Shippen – engineer, mixing
 Lucie Silvas – engineer, producer, programming
 Brad Spence – mixing, producer

Release history

References

2015 albums
Lucie Silvas albums
Decca Records albums